Giovani Govan Bernard (born November 22, 1991) is an American football running back who is a free agent. He played college football at North Carolina, and was drafted by the Cincinnati Bengals in the second round of the 2013 NFL Draft.

Early years
Bernard was born in West Palm Beach, Florida, the son of Haitian immigrant parents, who own a dry cleaning business in Boca Raton, Florida. He began playing football for the local tackle football league, the Boca Jets. He played football at St. Thomas Aquinas High School in Fort Lauderdale, Florida, where he was teammates with Florida State safety Lamarcus Joyner and New England Patriots running back James White. While in high school, he was ranked the No. 2 running back in Florida by the Orlando Sentinel and the No. 12 running back in the United States by Rivals.com. He is the younger brother of former Oregon State running back Yvenson Bernard.

Bernard was recruited by many schools and first committed to Notre Dame, but ultimately decided to play for the University of North Carolina.

College career

Bernard enrolled in the University of North Carolina at Chapel Hill, and played for the North Carolina Tar Heels football team from 2010 to 2012. During the third day of practice, he tore the ACL in his right knee after trying to cut away from a defender  and redshirted for the 2010 season.

Bernard recovered from the injury and became the starting tailback for the Tar Heels in the 2011 college football season. He became the first North Carolina running back to rush for at least 100 yards in five straight games since Ethan Horton in 1984. His season-high came against Georgia Tech on September 24, 2011, rushing for 155 yards. In mid-October 2011, Bernard was added to the watch list for the Maxwell Award, presented annually to the best player in college football. During the 2011 regular season, Bernard's 1,222 rushing yards ranked 20th among NCAA Division I FBS players. Bernard also had 326 receiving yards and 14 touchdowns in 10 games. Bernard was the first running back to eclipse the 1,000-yards plateau at North Carolina since Jonathan Linton did it in 1997. He was also the top freshman running back in the nation in yards per game that season.

In the first year of head coach Larry Fedora's spread offense in the 2012 season, Bernard increased his rushing yards per game, average yards per carry and receiving yards. He also returned punts for the first time in his college career. On October 27, 2012, Bernard returned a punt 74 yards against NC State in the last 30 seconds of the game to break the tie and win the game. He led Carolina in scoring for the second year in a row and averaged 198.1 all-purpose yards per game, third in the country behind two receivers. The head coaches in the ACC voted Bernard to All-ACC first-team and Bernard was second in player-of-the-year and offensive player-of-the-year voting. He also won the CFPA Punt Returner Trophy for the 2012 season. Overall, he finished the 2012 season with 1,228 rushing yards, 12 rushing touchdowns, 490 receiving yards, five receiving touchdowns, and two punt return touchdowns.

College career statistics

Professional career

Pre-draft
On December 14, 2012, Bernard announced that he was entering the 2013 NFL Draft. He was projected by the majority of analysts and scouts to be selected anywhere from the first to third round. He was ranked the fourth best running back and 67th best prospect by NFLDraftScout.com. Bernard was invited to the NFL Combine and completed all the drills and the entire workout. He was satisfied with his performance and decided to only participate in positional drills at North Carolina's Pro Day.

Cincinnati Bengals

2013 season
Bernard was selected by the Cincinnati Bengals in the second round with the 37th overall pick. The Bengals previously traded quarterback Carson Palmer to the Oakland Raiders in exchange for the pick used to select Bernard, and a 2012 1st round pick that was used to select Dre Kirkpatrick. Prior to Bernard, a running back from North Carolina had not been selected in the first two rounds of the NFL Draft since Natrone Means was drafted in the second round with the 41st overall pick by the San Diego Chargers in 1993.

On May 23, 2013, the Cincinnati Bengals signed Bernard to a four-year, $5.25 million contract, with a $2.2 million signing bonus and $3.2 million guaranteed.

Bernard began his rookie season serving as a back-up to veteran Benjarvus Green-Ellis and began transitioning to a change-of-pace back throughout the season. He made his professional regular season debut in the Bengals' season opener against the Chicago Bears. He finished his first career game with four carries for 22 rushing yards and an eight-yard reception. On September 16, 2013, Bernard scored two touchdowns in a 20–10 Monday Night Football win over the Bengals' division rival Pittsburgh Steelers.

On October 31, 2013, Bernard scored two touchdowns on nine carries in an overtime loss to the Miami Dolphins. Bernard's second score came on a 35-yard touchdown run that was praised by commentators as one of the best runs of the season. On December 8, 2013, Bernard had a season-high 99 rushing yards on 12 carries while also racking up 49 receiving yards on four catches in a 42–28 victory over the Indianapolis Colts. 

In his first season with the Bengals, they finished with an 11–5 record and made the playoffs. Bernard played in his first playoff game on January 5, 2014, a 27–10 loss to the San Diego Chargers.

Bernard finished his rookie season second on the team in rushing (695 yards), receptions (56), and total yards (1,209), while ranking third in receiving yards (514) and touchdowns (five rushing and three receiving). He was named to the NFL All-Rookie Team.

2014 season
After the Bengals drafted running back Jeremy Hill in the second round of the 2014 NFL Draft and Green-Ellis was released at the end of the preseason, Bernard was named the Bengals' starting running back to start the season. In their season opener at the AFC North division rival Baltimore Ravens, on September 7, 2014, Bernard earned his first career start, carrying the ball 14 times for 48 yards, and made six receptions for 62 receiving yards.

On October 12, 2014, against the Carolina Panthers, he had his first career game with over 100 rushing yards. After starting the first seven games of the season, he missed Weeks 9–11 due to injury. He finished his second season with a total of 168 carries, 680 rushing yards, five rushing touchdowns, 43 catches, 349 receiving yards, and two receiving touchdowns in 13 games and nine starts.

2015 season
Bernard entered training camp competing with Jeremy Hill to be the Cincinnati Bengals' starting running back. He was named the backup to Hill to begin the regular season.

On September 20, 2015, he had 20 carries for 123 rushing yards after taking over for Hill after he was benched for ineffective play during a 24–19 win over the San Diego Chargers. In Week 5, the Bengals pulled off the second biggest comeback in franchise history, rallying from 17 points down to defeat the two-time defending NFC-Champion Seattle Seahawks in overtime, 27–24. In the win, Bernard tallied 101 yards from scrimmage including 80 yards on the ground. On December 20, 2015, Bernard got his first start of the season against the San Francisco 49ers, rushing for 33 yards on 14 carries in a 24–14 Bengals' win. He finished the regular season with a total of 154 rushing attempts for 730 rushing yards and two touchdowns, while also recording 49 receptions for 472 receiving yards in 16 games and one start.

In the Bengals' 18–16 playoff loss to the Pittsburgh Steelers in the Wild Card Round, Bernard was injured on a hit by linebacker Ryan Shazier. He fumbled and lost the ball and did not return to the game and finished with six carries for 28 yards and two catches for two yards.

2016 season
On June 8, 2016, Bernard signed a three-year, $15.5 million contract extension with the Bengals. On September 18, 2016, Bernard caught a career-high nine passes for 100 yards and a touchdown against the Pittsburgh Steelers, his second 100-plus receiving yard game and his sixth receiving touchdown of his career. In a Week 5 matchup against the Dallas Cowboys, he earned his first start of the season and finished the 28–14 loss with nine carries for 50 yards and six receptions for 46 yards. On October 23, 2016, Bernard ran for a season-high 80 yards on 17 carries and a touchdown against the Cleveland Browns. The following week, Bernard scored his third touchdown of the season and had 11 carries for 52 rushing yards and a touchdown in a 27–27 tie with the Washington Redskins.

On November 20, 2016, Bernard suffered a torn ACL during a 16–12 loss to the Buffalo Bills and was placed on injured reserve, ending his season. He finished the 2016 season with 92 carries for 337 rushing yards and two touchdowns while also recording 39 receptions for 336 yards and a touchdown in ten games and two starts.

2017 season
In the 2017 offseason, the Bengals drafted Joe Mixon, adding another player to a crowded backfield. Bernard did not contribute as much on the ground but did have some solid production in the receiving game. In Weeks 3 and 4, he had consecutive games with a receiving touchdown. On Christmas Eve, against the Detroit Lions, he had 116 rushing yards, one rushing touchdown, seven receptions, and 52 receiving yards. On December 4, Bernard was hit by Steelers linebacker Ryan Shazier; the hit left Shazier with a spinal contusion that ultimately led to his premature retirement from the NFL. Overall, in the 2017 season, he had 458 rushing yards, two rushing touchdowns, 43 receptions, 389 receiving yards, and two receiving touchdowns.

2018 season
Bernard started the 2018 season as the backup to Mixon. In Week 3 against the Carolina Panthers, he recorded 61 rushing yards and a rushing touchdown. The following week, he recorded 25 carries for 69 rushing yards and two rushing touchdowns against the Atlanta Falcons. Overall, he finished the 2018 season with 211 rushing yards, three rushing touchdowns, and 35 receptions for 218 receiving yards.

2019 season

On September 3, 2019, the Bengals signed Bernard to a two-year, $10.3 million contract extension.
In a limited role behind Joe Mixon, Bernard totaled 53 carries for 170 rushing yards and 30 receptions for 234 receiving yards on the 2019 season.

2020 season
In Week 8 of the 2020 season, Bernard recorded a rushing touchdown and a receiving touchdown against the Tennessee Titans in a 31–20 victory. In Week 15 against the Pittsburgh Steelers on Monday Night Football, Bernard recorded 97 yards from scrimmage, one rushing touchdown, and one receiving touchdown during the 27–17 win. He finished the 2020 season with 124 carries for 416 rushing yards and three rushing touchdowns to go along with 47 receptions for 355 receiving yards and three receiving touchdowns.

The Bengals released Bernard on April 1, 2021.

Tampa Bay Buccaneers
Bernard signed with the Tampa Bay Buccaneers on April 14, 2021. He suffered a hip injury in Week 14 and was placed on injured reserve on December 14, 2021. He finished the 2021 season with eight carries for 58 rushing yards to go along with 23 receptions for 123 receiving yards and three receiving touchdowns. He was activated on January 15, 2022, for the Wild Card Round against the Philadelphia Eagles. He scored a rushing touchdown in the 31–15 victory.

On April 1, 2022, Bernard re-signed with the Buccaneers. Bernard suffered an ankle injury in Week 2 of the 2022 season and was placed on injured reserve on September 21, 2022. He was activated on November 26.

NFL career statistics

Personal life 
Bernard is Catholic.

References

External links

Tampa Bay Buccaneers bio
 North Carolina Tar Heels bio

1991 births
Living people
American football running backs
American sportspeople of Haitian descent
Cincinnati Bengals players
North Carolina Tar Heels football players
People from Davie, Florida
Players of American football from Florida
Sportspeople from Broward County, Florida
St. Thomas Aquinas High School (Florida) alumni
Tampa Bay Buccaneers players
African-American Catholics
Ed Block Courage Award recipients